The final round of the 2022 FIBA Women's Basketball World Cup took place from 29 September to 1 October 2022.

Qualified teams
The top four teams from each group qualified for the final round.

Bracket
A draw was conducted to decide the pairings of the quarterfinals. The two best-ranked teams in each group were drawn against the two teams ranked third and fourth in the other group.

All times are local (UTC+10).

Quarterfinals

United States vs Serbia

Puerto Rico vs Canada

China vs France

Belgium vs Australia

Semifinals

Canada vs United States

Australia vs China

Third place game

Final

References

F